Porthmadog railway station serves the town of Porthmadog on the Llŷn Peninsula in Gwynedd, Wales. The station is on the Cambrian Coast Railway with passenger services to Pwllheli, Harlech, Barmouth, Machynlleth, Shrewsbury and Birmingham.

History
Porthmadog has had a number of stations using this name, or the now-archaic anglicised form of Portmadoc. The present station was opened by the Aberystwith and Welsh Coast Railway as Portmadoc on 12 September 1867, and renamed Porthmadog on 5 May 1975. The Festiniog Railway's Porthmadog Harbour railway station was originally only a shunting yard, but was upgraded to a full station on 6 January 1865. It was renamed to Portmadoc Old on 8 June 1923, and then to Portmadoc on 23 July 1955. It was renamed to Porthmadog on 10 March 1973.

The Welsh Highland Railway (WH) run a station known as Porthmadog, which opened on 2 August 1980. Although located on High Street, is also (incorrectly) referred to as Tremadog Road.

Additionally there were two interim stations either side of, what is now, the Network Rail / WH  crossing. These were referred to as Portmadoc New, with the original Festionig Railway station becoming Portmadoc Old. The Festiniog Railway station opened on 8 June 1923 and closed on 16 September 1939, while the WH station opened in May 1929 and closed on 28 September 1936.

In 2014, main line services were suspended due to structural problems with the Pont Briwet viaduct near . Network Rail and Gwynedd Council were carrying out work to build a £20 million replacement for the current bridge a few metres downstream, but in doing so had caused the old one to sink and thus made it unsafe for both rail & road traffic. A replacement bus service operated during the railway's closure.

Services
Until the line between Bangor and Afonwen closed in 1964 there was a through service in the summer to and from London Euston via Crewe, Chester, Llandudno Junction and Caernarvon; the Pwllheli portion was detached at Afonwen and the forward coaches proceeded to Portmadoc (as it was then known). There was also a summer service between London Paddington and Pwllheli, via Birmingham Snow Hill, Shrewsbury and Machynlleth.

Trains currently call at Porthmadog roughly once every two hours Monday - Saturday, with a solitary train stopping in each direction on Sundays during the winter and two additional services each way in the summer (May - mid-September).

References
Citations

Sources

Further reading

External links

Railway stations in Gwynedd
DfT Category F1 stations
Former Cambrian Railway stations
Railway stations in Great Britain opened in 1867
Railway stations served by Transport for Wales Rail
Porthmadog